Finley Guy Building is a historic building in central Davenport, Iowa, United States. The Spanish Colonial Revival structure was listed on the National Register of Historic Places in 1984.

History
Finley Guy had this building constructed in 1928 to house his drug store. Lorenzen Grocery and Meat Market occupied the second commercial space. The building has housed a rental shop for many years. Guy himself made his home in the second-floor residential space.

Architecture
The Finley Guy Building is noteworthy for its use of Spanish Colonial Revival architecture. The style was rarely employed in Davenport and when it was used it is found in residential architecture. The building features heavily textured polychrome face brick and metal casement windows. Both decorative elements are typical of buildings constructed in Davenport in the late 1920s and in the 1930s, but they are generally found in Tudor Revival and Cotswold Cottage styles. The building is also noteworthy for its use of molded concrete decoration. Spiral colonnettes frame windows on the second floor, and tiles with a variety of patterns are found on the parapet level. The concrete window surrounds have a helical pattern. There is also a concrete plaque between the main floor shop windows with a caduceus, which refers to the building's original use as a drug store.

References

Commercial buildings completed in 1928
Mission Revival architecture in Iowa
Spanish Revival architecture in Iowa
Buildings and structures in Davenport, Iowa
Commercial buildings on the National Register of Historic Places in Iowa
National Register of Historic Places in Davenport, Iowa